"Next to You, Next to Me" is a song written by Robert Ellis Orrall and Curtis Wright, and recorded by American country music group Shenandoah.  It was released in June 1990 as the lead-off single from their album Extra Mile.  It was a Number One hit in both the United States and Canada. It is also the band's longest-lasting number 1, at three weeks. As of 2006, no other single from Columbia had spent three weeks atop the country charts.

The song received a nomination for Single of the Year by the Academy of Country Music.

Content
The song is an up-tempo, in which the narrator exclaims that he would rather be sitting next to his lover than be anywhere else.

Other versions
It was covered by Rascal Flatts as a bonus track on the deluxe version of their 2012 album Changed.

Music video
The music video was directed by Larry Boothby. It depicts the band singing the song in a basement, and various characters posing in front of a red pickup.

Chart performance

Year-end charts

References

Shenandoah (band) songs
1990 singles
Songs written by Robert Ellis Orrall
Songs written by Curtis Wright
Columbia Records singles
1990 songs